El miedo no anda en burro (Fear Doesn't Ride a Donkey) is a 1976 Mexican comedy horror film directed by Fernando Cortés and starring María Elena Velasco, Eleazar García, Fernando Luján, Emma Roldán and Óscar Ortiz de Pinedo.

Literally, the title is an idiom used to express that fear strikes quickly, not calmly as if on top of a donkey. The film is one of the most successful comedies of the India María franchise, having remained in the Cine Metropolitan for an astounding nineteen weeks.

Plot
María Nicolasa Cruz is doña Clarita's loyal indigenous maid. However, meanwhile doña Clarita is dying, she is leaving behind a large monetary estate, a mansion, properties, and Mimí: her affectionate Shih Tzu dog. María is with doña Clarita during her last moments, albeit her sister Paz, brother Marciano, nephew Braulio, and grandsons Raul and Laura are waiting anxiously downstairs for her death, believing they will inherit all her riches. Doña Clarita finally dies at the hand of a corrupt doctor employed by doña Clarita's relatives, and María inconsolably goes downstairs to the living room to deliver the news. As expected, María finds none of doña Clarita's relatives mourning her death. Believing she is of no use anymore, doña Clarita's relatives (or "The Vultures" as María calls them) fire María, therefore she decides to return to her native hometown. Marciano, Paz, Braulio, Raul, and Laura meet with the notary to hear Doña Clarita's will. To everyone's surprise, the will only mentions Mimí (the dog), and María as her guardian. The family members go back to stop María from leaving the mansion.

The "zopilotes" (vultures, María's nickname for Doña Clarita's family) convince María to stay in the mansion to take care of Mimí as her new guardian. The "zopilotes" try several times to kill María along with Mimí but their attempts go awry. Until Marciano feeds Mimí a piece of meat with an explosive inside. Before Mimí eats it, María takes it from her and cooks it for the afternoon meal. Braulio, unfortunately, receives the piece of meat and after cutting it, the explosive goes off. Mimí ears were gravely affected. The doctor advises María to go on a vacation with Mimí - to Doña Clarita's old vacation house in Guanajuato. Upon arrival, María and Mimí are scared by the butler Franki who guides them through the haunted house. Both María and Mimí survive two scary hands, a cyclop, a giant talking frog, a fern monster, a werewolf, and many more horrific things.
To María's surprise, she discovers that those scary characters are the "zopilotes". They catch them and put them in a squishing torture machine. María and Mimí, on the verge of death, are saved by Franki who was a detective investigating Doña Clarita's murder - committed by her family members. María with all these surprises asks Franki, whose real name is Maldonado, permission to faint on the floor. As she does, Marciano, Paz, Braulio, Raul, and Laura end up arrested for homicide.

Cast
María Elena Velasco as María Nicolasa Cruz
Eleazar García as Braulio
Fernando Luján as Raúl
Emma Roldán as doña Paz
Óscar Ortiz de Pinedo as don Marciano
Gloria Mayo as Laura
Alfredo Wally Barrón as Frankie / Maldonado (credited as Wally Barron)
José Cibrián Jr. as American tourist
Antonio Bravo as Doctor
Carlos Bravo y Fernández as Notary
Alfonso Zayas as Policeman
Mimí as herself (Eleazar García "Chelelo" was her owner)

References

External links

Mexican comedy horror films
Haunted house films
1970s comedy horror films
1976 films
1976 comedy films